A sternpost is the upright structural member or post at the stern of a (generally wooden) ship or a boat, to which are attached the transoms and the rearmost left corner part of the stern.

The sternpost may either be completely vertical or may be tilted or "raked" slightly aft.  It rests on or "fays to" the ship's keel.

See also

 Boat building
 Shipbuilding

References

Watercraft components